There were 21 teams in the 1995 Tour de France, each composed of 9 cyclists. The teams were selected in two rounds: in May 1995, the first fifteen teams were announced:

In June, five wildcards were announced:

Shortly before the start, Le Groupement folded because their team leader Luc Leblanc was injured, and because of financial problems. Their spot went to Aki–Gipiemme, the first team in the reserve list.

Teams

Qualified teams

Invited teams

/

Cyclists

By starting number

By team

By nationality

References

1995 Tour de France
1995